The men's bantamweight (54 kg/118.8 lbs) Low-Kick category at the W.A.K.O. World Championships 2007 in Belgrade was the second lightest of the male Low-Kick tournaments and the most sparse, involving just six fighters from three continents (Europe, Asia and Africa).  Each of the matches was three rounds of two minutes each and were fought under Low-Kick rules.   

Due to the small number of competitors for a tournament designed for eight men, two of the contestants had byes through to the semi finals.  The eventual tournament champion was Azerbaijani Emil Karimov who defeated the Bulgarian Jordan Vassilev by technical knockout in the final to claim gold.  Defeated semi finalists Fabrice Bauluck from Mauritius and Moroccan Younes Ouali Alami won bronze medals.

Results

Key

See also
List of WAKO Amateur World Championships
List of WAKO Amateur European Championships
List of male kickboxers

References

External links
 WAKO World Association of Kickboxing Organizations Official Site

Kickboxing events at the WAKO World Championships 2007 Belgrade
2007 in kickboxing
Kickboxing in Serbia